Bengtsår is an island in the municipality of Hanko, Finland. It is mainly used by the city of Helsinki to hold annual summer camps for children.

External links
 Official website of the Bengtsår summer camps (in Finnish)
 Website of the Bengtsår island

Finnish islands in the Baltic
Islands of Uusimaa